Alexander Rodin, sometimes spelled as Alexandr or Alex Rodin (Belarusian pronunciation: Aliaksandr Rodzin; 15 May 1947 – 19 December 2022) was a Belarusian contemporary painter.

Biography 
Alexandr Rodin was born on 15 May 1947 in Baranovichi, a city in the Brest Region of western Belarus. He moved to Minsk in 1950. From 1960 until 1965 he studied at the 'School of Arts nr. 1' in the same city; in 1966 he started a study at the Belarusian State Academy of Arts, which he finished in 1971. His first exhibition was in 1971 at the Exhibition of Young Artists at the Belarusian National Arts Museum. Since 1971, he had held over 100 exhibitions in Belarus, Russia, the Netherlands, Belgium, France and Germany. He resided at Kunsthaus Tacheles, Berlin, Germany for 12 years, because (as he describes it himself in an interview with website .eu) 'Berlin is a place interested in art. [...] I am an artist and exhibitions are my life. And when I suggest a concept of an exhibition or an event and see that it fascinates Germans – why not to organize it there? Why not to hold an exhibition in Berlin when it acknowledges my creativity?'.

Work 
Art critic Larysa Mikhnevich described him as "the representative of neo-avart-garde and of the 'good old' painting: anecdotic and figurative". His works are often large in size (up to over 6 metres in length and 2 metres in height, albeit spread out over several canvases), and represent surreal scenes in Rodin's mental universe. Rodin's paintings can always be interpreted in several ways.

Exhibitions 
1971 graduated from the Belarusian Academy of Arts. 

1980 became a member of the Belarusian Artists Union. 

2000 became a member of the International Guild of Artists.

2001 became a member of the Contemporary Art Association. 

From 2001 to 2014 was a resident artist of Kunsthaus Tacheles, Berlin, Germany. 

Since 2003 organized the international festival of experimental art DAСH in Germany and Belarus.

 1971 – Exhibition of Young Artists, National Museum, Minsk, Belarus
 1976 – Republican Exhibition, National Gallery, Minsk, Belarus
 1980 – Personal Exhibition, Hall of the Belarusian Artists Union, Minsk, Belarus
 1988 – Personal Exhibition "Rush Hour", Museum of the Great War, Minsk, Belarus
 1989 – Group Exhibition Treasure of the Belarusian Avant-garde, Minsk, Belarus
 1990 – Group Exhibition, The Centre of Contemporary Art Norblin, Warsaw, Poland
 1990 – Exhibition "Cassandra Call", National Gallery, Minsk, Belarus
 1991 – Personal Exhibition, Centre House of Artists, Moscow, Russia
 1992 – Group Exhibition "Art Shock", Palace of Arts, Minsk, Belarus
 1993 – Group Exhibition, Days of Belarusian Art at the Exhibition Hall of Ukrainian Artists Union, Kyev, Ukraine
 1993 – Group Exhibition, Julia-Nova, Italy
 1994 – Personal Exhibition, Gallery "The Sixth Line", Minsk, Belarus
 1994 – Personal Exhibition, Centre of Experimental Arts, Vlissingen, Netherlands
 1996 – Personal Exhibition, Gallery "IFIAC", Brussels, Belgium
 1997 – Group Exhibition, Herbert Exhibition Centre, Paris, France
 1998 – Group Exhibition "Pahonia", National Gallery, Minsk, Belarus
 1999 – Personal Exhibition, National Gallery, Minsk, Belarus
 2002 – Group Exhibition, Gallery of Pierre Cardin, Paris, France
 2003 – Group Exhibition, Klermon-Ferron, France
 2004 – Personal Exhibition, National Library, Minsk, Belarus
 2006 – Personal Exhibition, Podzemka Art Gallery, Minsk, Belarus
 2008 – Group Exhibition, Museum of Nonconformism, St-Petersburg, Russia
 2008 – Group Exhibition "Biennale of Fine Arts", National Library, Minsk, Belarus
 2008 – Personal Exhibition at the Gallery "Dobryja mysli", Minsk, Belarus
 2008 – Personal Exhibition "Dach-5", Museum of Contemporary Arts, Minsk, Belarus
 2009 – Personal Exhibition "Dach-9", Minsk, Belarus
 2010 – Group Exhibition "Belarusian Art Week", the National Art Museum, Minsk, Belarus
 2001–2014 – Personal Exhibition, Kunsthaus "Tacheles", Berlin, Germany
 2014–2018 – Personal Exhibition, festival "Fregs of Nature", Berlin, Germany
 2014–2018 – Personal Exhibition, festival "Odyssee", Berlin, Germany
 2016–2018 – Personal Exhibition "Global warning/Global warming", Minsk, Belarus
 2019 – Personal Exhibition, "Mythologeme of the millennium", Minsk, Belarus
 2021 – Group Exhibition, "Labyrinth", Minsk, Belarus
 2021 – Personal Exhibition "Trans Atlantic Art Message", National Library, Minsk, Belarus
 2022 – Personal Exhibition "Stolen inspiration", Minsk, Belarus
 2022 – Group Exhibition & Concert  (Rodin, Missing, Pijarowski, Skrzek), Centrum Kultury Stary Młyn, Zgierz, Poland. 
Rodin's works are at the National Art Museum of Belarus, the Museum of Modern Art in Minsk, Belarus, Hasso-Platter Institute in Potsdam Germany and numerous private collections in Germany, Switzerland, UK, Poland, France, the USA, Italy, Sweden, the Netherlands, Russia, Belgium and other countries.

References 

1947 births
2022 deaths
People from Baranavichy
Artists from Minsk
20th-century Belarusian painters
Belarusian State Academy of Arts alumni
20th-century male artists
21st-century Belarusian painters
21st-century male artists
Belarusian male painters